Rome Township may refer to:

 Rome Township, Jefferson County, Illinois
 Rome Township, Jones County, Iowa
 Rome Township, Lenawee County, Michigan
 Rome Township, Faribault County, Minnesota
 Rome Township, Ashtabula County, Ohio
 Rome Township, Athens County, Ohio
 Rome Township, Lawrence County, Ohio
 Rome Township, Bradford County, Pennsylvania
 Rome Township, Crawford County, Pennsylvania
 Rome Township, Davison County, South Dakota, in Davison County, South Dakota
 Rome Township, Deuel County, South Dakota, in Deuel County, South Dakota

Township name disambiguation pages